Clara "Claretta" Petacci (28 February 1912 – 28 April 1945) was a mistress of the Italian dictator Benito Mussolini. She was killed during Mussolini's execution by Italian partisans.

Early life
Daughter of Giuseppina Persichetti (1888–1962) and the physician Francesco Saverio Petacci (1883–1970), Clara Petacci was born into a privileged and religious family in Rome in 1912. Her father, a physician of the Holy Apostolic Palaces, became a supporter of fascism. A child when Mussolini rose to power in the 1920s, Clara Petacci idolised him from an early age. After Violet Gibson attempted to assassinate the dictator in April 1926, the 14-year-old Petacci wrote to him commenting "O, Duce, why was I not with you? ... Could I not have strangled that murderous woman?"

Relationship with Mussolini
Petacci had a long-standing relationship with Mussolini while he was married to Rachele Mussolini. Petacci was 28 years younger than Mussolini. They met for the first time in April 1932 when Mussolini driving with an aide to Ostia overtook a car occupied by the twenty-year old Petacci and family members. She called out "Duce! Duce!" and when he stopped, told him that she had been writing to him since her early teens. 

In 1934 Petacci married Italian Air Force officer Riccardo Federici, but she parted ways with her husband when he was sent as Air Attaché to Tokyo in 1936. Petacci then became mistress to the fifty-three-year-old Mussolini, visiting the  where a small apartment was reserved for her. Her infatuation with Mussolini appears to have been genuine and permanent. He by contrast welcomed a long-term controlling relationship of an easily dominated and credulous young woman. The affair became widely known and members of the Petacci family, notably her brother, Marcello, were able to benefit financially and professionally by influence-selling.  

Part of Petacci and Mussolini's correspondence has not been released on the grounds of privacy.

Death

On 27 April 1945, Mussolini and Petacci were captured by partisans while traveling with a Luftwaffe convoy retreating to Germany. The German column included a number of Italian Social Republic members.

On 28 April, she and Mussolini were taken to Mezzegra and executed.  On the following day, the bodies of Mussolini and Petacci were taken to Piazzale Loreto in Milan and hung upside down in front of an Esso petrol station.  The bodies were photographed as a crowd vented their rage upon them. On the same day, Clara's brother, Marcello Petacci, was also killed in Dongo by the partisans, along with fifteen other people complicit in Mussolini's escape. 

After the war the family of Petacci began civil and criminal court cases against Walter Audisio for Petacci's unlawful killing. After a lengthy legal process, an investigating judge eventually closed the case in 1967 and acquitted Audisio of murder and embezzlement on the ground that the actions complained of occurred as an act of war against the Germans and the fascists during a period of enemy occupation.

In popular culture

"Caesar and Claretta", a 1975 episode of the BBC-TV program Private Affairs, starring Helen Mirren
Claretta, 1984 film starring Claudia Cardinale
Mussolini: The Untold Story, 1985 TV-miniseries featured Virginia Madsen as Petacci
 Mussolini and I, in which she is played by Barbara De Rossi
 The Dictator's Playbook, 2019 PBS documentary

See also

Margherita Sarfatti, one of Mussolini's earlier mistresses
Eva Braun, Adolf Hitler's mistress

References

Sources

Further reading

 Bosworth, R.J.B. (2017). Claretta: Mussolini's Last Lover, Yale University Press 
 Farrell, Nicholas (2003). Mussolini: A New Life, Phoenix Press: London 
 Garibaldi, Luciano (2004). Mussolini: The Secrets of His Death, Enigma Books, New York 
 Moseley, Ray (2004). Mussolini: The Last 600 Days of Il Duce, Taylor Trade Publishing, Dallas 

Mistresses of Benito Mussolini
1912 births
1945 deaths
Executed Italian women
20th-century executions by Italy
People from Rome
People executed by Italy by firing squad
20th-century Italian women